Sar Darreh-ye Beyglar Beygi (also Romanized as Sar Darreh-ye Beyglar Beygī; also known as Sardarreh and Sar Darreh) is a village in Sarab Rural District, in the Central District of Sonqor County, Kermanshah Province, Iran. At the 2006 census, its population was 122, in 29 families.

References 

Populated places in Sonqor County